Sudeep Kumar is an Indian playback singer.
He sings Indian classical, devotional, and popular music. He has recorded more than 5000 songs in languages including Malayalam, Tamil, Kannada and Sanskrit, during a career spanning two decades. He is the president of Malayalam playback singers' association SAMAM (Singers' Association- Malayalam Movies)

Personal life 

Sudeep is born to Kainakary Surendran and Rajamma. Sudeep had his education at St Joseph's High School, Punnapra, SD College, Alappuzha, from where he did his graduation in Malayalam, and Government Law college, Thiruvananthapuram. He is married to classical dancer Kalamandalam Sophia. They have two daughters, Minsara and Neehara.

Playback singing career

Debut and early career
The early stages of his career were marked by singing for dramas and albums. He worked with notable musicians including his mentor Kalavoor Balan, N.P. Prabhakaran, Alleppey Vivekanandan, Alleppey Rishikesh, Kumarakam Rajappan, Vypin Surendran, K.M.Udayan, T.S.Radhakrishnan, Sebi Nayarambalam, Samji Aarattupuzha, M.G.Anil, Raveendran Thiruvalla, Vidhyadharan master, R.Somasekharan, Jerry Amaldev, Johnson, Raveendran, M.G.Radhakrishnan, Perumbavoor G.Raveendranath, V.Dakshinamoorthy, M.K.Arjunan, and G.Devarajan.

His first film audio Thalolam released in 1998 (lyrics and music by Kaithapram) was produced by Johny Sagariga, who introduced him to the audio industry. It was in 1999 that Sudeep Kumar met Devarajan master which proved to be a turning point in his career. In the year 2000, when Devarajan master conducted a stage show titled Five promising singers of the new millennium, Sudeep Kumar was one among the five.

Music career 

Sudeep Kumar was introduced as a playback singer by the director Vinayan in his movie Oomapenninu Uriyaadappayyan. The soundtrack of the film was composed by Mohan Sitara and lyrics were penned by Yusuf Ali Kecheri. Subsequently, he got songs in Vinayan's movies such as Kattu Chembakam, Vellinakshatram and Albhuthadweepu (Malayalam & Tamil). Over the years he associated with music directors such as Ousepachan, Mohan Sitara, M.M.Keeravani, Kaithapram, Rajamani, Berny Ignatious, M.G. Sreekumar, Kaithapram Viswanathan, Bijibal, Rony Raphael, Shan Rahman & Gopi Sundar

Composer M.Jayachandran gave major opportunities for Sudeep Kumar which placed him as a playback singer in the Malayalam film industry. They have worked together in more than 20 films in Malayalam and the result has been hit songs such as Odiyan (Kondoram), Madambi (Ente sharike), Shikar (Enthedi), Rathinirvedam(Chempakapoo), Chattakari (Nilave), and Swapna sanchari (Vellaramkunnileri).

Television

On television he has compered music-related programmes on Asianet, namely Pa Dha Ni Sa, Gaanasamasya, Music Live, and Limelight. He has appeared in Sangeethasaagaram and as a guest performer in Idea Star Singer.

He has worked as a mentor on the music reality show Gandharvasangeetham on Kairali TV . He has also worked as a groomer in Idea Star Singer Season 3 and 6 and Amritha Junior Superstar.

Awards 
 Kerala State Award
 2012 - Won - Best Male Playback Singer - "Chempakapoo." - Rathinirvedam
 Other Awards
 2009 - Vayalar Chalachithra Award for Best Male Playback Singer - "Madhuram Gayathi Meera" - Benaras
 2011 - KAVIA Singer of the year Award for Best Male Playback Singer - "Enthedi" -(Shikkar )
 2009 - P.Bhaskaran Foundation Film Award for Best Male Playback Singer - "Chempakapoo" - (Rathinirvedam )
 2009 - Jesy Foundation Film Award for Best Male Playback Singer - "Chempakapoo" - Rathinirvedam
 2009 - Radio Mirchi South Indian Film Music Award for Best Male Playback Singer - "Chempakapoo" - (Rathinirvedam )
 2008 - Jeevan TV Award for the Bbest Album Singer  - "Ekakikalude Geetham" - Ekakikalude Geetham
 2014 - Kerala Film Critics Association Award - Best Male Singer - "Vaarmathiye" - ( Once Upon a time, There Was a Kallan )
 2018 Vanitha Film Award - Male singer - Best duet song - " Kondoram"-Odiyan

References

President of Malayalam Playback Singers' Association SAMAM

Malayalam playback singers
1975 births
Living people
Indian male playback singers
Singers from Kerala
Musicians from Alappuzha
Film musicians from Kerala
21st-century Indian singers
21st-century Indian male singers